The ocellate triplefin, Apopterygion oculus, is a threefin blenny of the family Tripterygiidae, found around the coast of New Zealand to depths of between 14 and 186 m in reef areas of broken rock and shellgrit. Its length is up to 6.3 cm.

References

ocellate triplefin
Endemic marine fish of New Zealand
ocellate triplefin